Ten Out of Ten or 10/10 may refer to:

Music
 Ten Out of 10, 10cc album
"10/10", a 2010 song by Paolo Nutini.
 "Ten Out of Ten", song shortlisted for selection by the United Kingdom in the Eurovision Song Contest 1964

Books
 Ten Out of Ten, collection of stories by Allan Baillie
 The Princess Diaries, Volume X: Forever Princess, published in the United Kingdom as The Princess Diaries: Ten Out of Ten